Captain The Honourable  Robert Arthur Ward, OBE (23 February 1871 – 14 June 1942), was a British soldier and Conservative politician.

Biography

Ward was the third son of William Ward, 1st Earl of Dudley, and his second wife Georgina Elisabeth, daughter of Sir Thomas Moncreiffe, 7th Baronet. William Ward, 2nd Earl of Dudley, was his elder brother. He was returned to Parliament for Crewe in the 1895 general election, a seat he held until 1900.

Ward fought in the Matabeleland campaign of 1896. He served with the 4th Battalion, Imperial Yeomanry, in the Second Boer War from early 1900 until he resigned his commission 5 March 1902, when he was appointed a second lieutenant of the Worcestershire Yeomanry (The Queen's Own Worcestershire Hussars). He later served in the First World War, where he was twice mentioned in despatches. In 1919 he was appointed an Officer of the Order of the British Empire (OBE).

Ward married Lady Mary Acheson, daughter of Archibald Acheson, 4th Earl of Gosford and his wife Lady Louisa Montagu, in 1906. He died in June 1942, aged 71.

References

External links 

1871 births
1942 deaths
Younger sons of earls
Conservative Party (UK) MPs for English constituencies
UK MPs 1895–1900
Officers of the Order of the British Empire
Robert
Worcestershire Yeomanry officers